The Photographical Congress Arrives in Lyon (also known as Neuville-sur-Saône: Débarquement du congrès des photographie à Lyon) is an 1895 French short black-and-white silent documentary film directed and produced by Louis Lumière and starring P.J.C. Janssen as himself. It was first screened on 12 June 1895.

Plot

Photographers leave the deck of a riverboat in large numbers. In the background a bridge can be seen spanning the river. The video covers a group who have assembled in Neuville for the Congress of Photographic Societies. The film was produced in the morning and then screened to the congress that afternoon.

Production
This short documentary was filmed in Neuville-sur-Saône, Rhône, France. It was filmed by means of the Cinématographe, an all-in-one camera, which also serves as a film projector and developer. As with all early Lumière movies, this film was made in a 35 mm format with an aspect ratio of 1.33:1.

Cast
 P.J.C. Janssen as himself

Current status
Given its age, this short film is available to freely download from the Internet. It has also featured in a number of film collections including Landmarks of Early Film volume 1.

References

External links
The Lumiere Institute (requires QuickTime)
 
 The Photographical Congress Arrives in Lyon on YouTube

1895 films
French black-and-white films
Films set in Lyon
French silent short films
French short documentary films
Films directed by Auguste and Louis Lumière
1890s short documentary films
Black-and-white documentary films